Novoselki is a rural locality (a village) in Lyubomirovskoye Rural Settlement, Sheksninsky District, Vologda Oblast, Russia. The population was 4 as of 2002.

Geography 
Novoselki is located 28 km southeast of Sheksna (the district's administrative centre) by road. Levo is the nearest rural locality.

References 

Rural localities in Sheksninsky District